Ioan Krieshofer (born 1904, date of death unknown) was a Romanian footballer who played as a defender.

International career
Ioan Krieshofer played one friendly match for Romania, on 31 August 1924 under coach Teofil Morariu in a 4–1 loss against Czechoslovakia.

References

External links
 

1904 births
Year of death missing
Romanian footballers
Romania international footballers
Place of birth missing
Association football defenders
Victoria Cluj players